The Burmese peacock softshell turtle (Nilssonia formosa) is a species of softshell turtle in the Trionychidae family. It is one of five species in the genus Nilssonia.

Geographical region
The Burmese peacock softshell is found in Myanmar and possibly Thailand. Also reported to be found in Karbi Anglong district of Assam. Nuclear data analyses of a Nilssonia formosa caught near Shuangbai, Yunnan, China by researchers in 2012 suggests the species crossed the watershed between the Salween and Mekong Rivers.

References

Bibliography

Further reading
 Alderton, D. 1988. Turtles and tortoises of the world. Facts on File, New York.
 Anderson, J. 1875. "Description of some new Asiatic mammals and Chelonia". Ann. Mag. nat. Hist. (4) 16: 282–285.

External links
 Species: Nilssonia formosa (Burmese peacock softshell turtle) Turtles of the World. Authors: C.H. Ernst, R.G.M. Altenburg & R.W. Barbour
 Austin's turtle page.com
 Nilssonia Gallery of Nilssonia formosa Burmese Peacock Softshell Turtle from Chelonia.org
 

Nilssonia (turtle)
Reptiles described in 1869
Endemic fauna of Myanmar
Reptiles of Myanmar
Reptiles of Thailand
Taxonomy articles created by Polbot